
Zgierz County is a unit of territorial administration and local government (powiat) in Łódź Voivodeship, central Poland. It came into being on January 1, 1999, as a result of the Polish local government reforms passed in 1998.

As of 2016 its total population is 165,206, out of which the population of Zgierz is 56,929, that of Ozorków is 19,809, that of Aleksandrów Łódzki is 21,380, that of Głowno is 14,534, that of Stryków is 3,477, and the rural population is 49,077.

Neighbouring counties
Zgierz County is bordered by Łowicz County to the north-east, Brzeziny County to the east, the city of Łódź, Łódź East County and Pabianice County to the south, Poddębice County to the west, and Łęczyca County to the north-west.

Administrative division
The county is subdivided into nine gminas (three urban, two urban-rural and four rural). These are listed in the following table, in descending order of population.

References

 
Zgierz